Civic Jams is the fourth studio album by English electronic music duo Darkstar. It was released on 19 June 2020 under Warp.

Singles
On 20 February 2020, the band announced their first single in four years, "Wolf". Their second single "Jam" was released on 1 May 2020, along with the announcement of the new album. On 17 June 2020, the third single "Text" was released.

Critical reception
Civic Jams was met with "generally favourable" reviews from critics. At Metacritic, which assigns a weighted average rating out of 100 to reviews from mainstream publications, this release received an average score of 71, based on 5 reviews. Aggregator Album of the Year gave the album 67 out of 100 based on a critical consensus of 6 reviews.

Track listing

References

2020 albums
Darkstar (band) albums
Warp (record label) albums